Masters of Science Fiction is a television anthology series by some of the producers of Masters of Horror. The show debuted on ABC on August 4, 2007, at 10PM for a run of four episodes. It was originally scheduled to run in six parts, but two episodes were removed from the schedule for undisclosed reasons.

The show follows a similar format as Masters of Horror, with each hour long episode taking the form of a separate short film adaptation of a story by a respected member of the science fiction community, hence the Masters in the title.

In December 2007, the show was picked up by Space in Canada. This was followed by the North American premiere of the missing two episodes.  A Region 1 DVD of all six episodes was released on August 5, 2008. On February 12, 2012, the Science Channel began airing the episodes, under the title Stephen Hawking's Sci-Fi Masters, beginning with the first domestic airing of the episode "Watchbird".

The show is hosted off-screen by physicist Stephen Hawking.

Episodes

References

Notes

External links
 Masters of Science Fiction press release
 The Futon's Summer Preview: ABC's Masters of Science Fiction
 The Futon's First Look: Masters of Science Fiction (ABC)
 "Cast Set for Masters of Sci Fi", Zap2it, August 4, 2006.
 

2000s American science fiction television series
2000s American anthology television series
2007 American television series debuts
2007 American television series endings
2000s Canadian science fiction television series
2000s Canadian anthology television series
2007 Canadian television series debuts
2007 Canadian television series endings
American Broadcasting Company original programming
Space adventure television series
Science fiction anthology television series
Television shows filmed in Vancouver